The Alas Building is a Rationalist residential and office building located in the San Nicolás section of Buenos Aires, Argentina. It stands at a height of 141 metres (463 ft) and houses 41 floors. 

Alas was the tallest building in Buenos Aires between 1955 and 1995, when it was surpassed by the Le Parc tower. It has long been a vital part of the skyline of Buenos Aires, together with other, neighboring buildings on Leandro Alem Avenue, such as the similar Comega Building (1930), as well as those built in the International style during the 1970s (notably the Catalinas Norte development). Recently, however, it was overshadowed by the construction of several towers in the Puerto Madero area; as of 2009, it remains the 20th tallest building in Argentina. 

The building was commissioned in 1950 by President Juan Perón for the Association of Unionized Latin American Workers (ATLAS, S.A.); he ordered that plans include an underground bunker for use in case of war or a coup d'état. Perón, however, did not seek refuge there during the 16 June 1955 bombing of Plaza de Mayo by the Argentine Navy in an attempted coup, nor was he able to do so during his eventual overthrow, three months later. 

The building was transferred to the Argentine Air Force after the 1955 coup, and renamed ALAS ("wings"). The bunker was later converted into Argentine Public Television studios. These were relocated to Figueroa Alcorta Avenue in 1978, though two underground floors are still in occupied by parking spaces, a gym, the boiler room, bike racks and other amenities.

References

Office buildings completed in 1951
Buildings and structures in Buenos Aires
Residential skyscrapers in Argentina
Skyscraper office buildings in Argentina